Controller may refer to:

Occupations 
 Controller or financial controller, or in government accounting comptroller, a senior accounting position
 Controller, someone who performs agent handling in espionage
 Air traffic controller, a person who directs aircraft

Computing and electronics 
 Model–view–controller, an architectural pattern used in software engineering
 Controller (computing)
 Microcontroller, a small computer on a single integrated circuit
 Game controller, an input device used for playing video games

Control engineering 
 Control theory, control of continuously operating dynamical systems in engineered processes and machines
 Irrigation controller, a device to automate irrigation systems
 PID controller, a control loop feedback mechanism
 Control loop, contains all the control elements for controlling a process variable
 Anti-lock brake controller, in an anti-lock braking system
 Industrial control system, a general term used in industrial process control
 Proportional control, a type of linear feedback control system

Biomedical 
 Elite controllers, individuals who do not develop AIDS after exposure to HIV

Fiction 
 Controller (comics), multiple characters
 Controller (Marvel Comics), a fictional character in Marvel Comics
 Controllers (DC Comics), a fictional extraterrestrial race in the DC Universe
 The Fat Controller (Sir Topham Hatt), the head of the railway in The Railway Series of books written by the Reverend W.V. Awdry, also The Thin Controller and The Small Controller on other railway lines in those books
 Controller, a being controlled by a Yeerk in the Animorphs series by K.A. Applegate
 The Controller, an AI system in the Armored Core 3 video game

Music 
 Controller (Misery Signals album), 2008
 Controller (British India album), 2013
 The Controllers (R&B band), a 1980s rhythm-and-blues band
 MIDI controller, device which allows people or machines to control multiple aspects of audiovisual performances with MIDI messages
 "Controller" (song), a 2017 song by New Zealand L.A.B.
 "Controller", a song from the 1981 album Only a Lad by the new-wave band Oingo Boingo
 "The Controller", a nickname of musician Nick Rhodes.

See also 
 Control (disambiguation)
 Control unit (disambiguation)
 "Controlla", 2016 single by Drake